Kasule Owen (born 3 March 1989 in Kampala) is a Ugandan soccer player, who plays as a midfielder for Uganda super league club URA SC.

Club career

Early career
Owen started his playing career at Nakawa United before joining Kampala City Council FC

Bunamwaya F.C
In 2008, Owen joined Bunamwaya SC   where he won the League Title with them in 2009–10, scoring 12 goals from and qualified for African Champions League.

Hoang Anh Gia Lai F.C
In 2012, Owen  joined Vietnamese club Hoang Anh Gia Lai F.C. where he played one season scoring 1 goals in 6 league games.

URA SC
In the summer of 2012, Owen joined Ugandan URA SC.

References

External links
 
 goal.com

1989 births
Living people
Ugandan footballers
Sportspeople from Kampala
Kampala Capital City Authority FC players
Hoang Anh Gia Lai FC players
V.League 1 players
Uganda international footballers
Association football midfielders
Vipers SC players
Uganda A' international footballers
2011 African Nations Championship players
Ugandan expatriate sportspeople in Vietnam
Ugandan expatriate footballers
Expatriate footballers in Vietnam